Vermilion Bay may refer to:

Vermilion Bay (Louisiana), a bay on the coast of Louisiana in the United States
Vermilion Bay, Ontario, a community in Ontario, Canada
Vermilion Bay Airport, an airport near Machin, Ontario, Canada 
Vermilion Bay Water Aerodrome, a water aerodrome near Vermilion Bay, Ontario, Canada